Merle John Isaac (October 12, 1898 – March 11, 1996) was an American composer and prolific arranger who focused on arranging famous pieces for performers of lower experience, especially school orchestras.

Music and recognition
After graduating from the VanderCook College of Music in 1932, he began to teach at John Marshall High School, in Chicago, Illinois. While he was there, Isaac realized that there were few good music available to lower-level orchestras, and began to arrange music for his orchestra, beginning with Bohm's Perpetual Motion. After 35 years working in Chicago area schools, he retired from education, though he continued to be a clinician and guest conductor around the United States, and also continued arranging. In 1993, the American String Teachers Association gave Isaac a lifetime achievement award, and annually through 1997 continued giving awards under his name. They also have an annual Merle J. Isaac composition contest to "encourage the composition, publication, and performance of music of quality for the benefit of school orchestra programs."

Personal life 
Isaac's family included his wife, Margaret, and their daughter, Margrethe (May 6, 1927 – August 14, 2007).

Isaac died of natural causes on March 11, 1996, in Des Plaines, Illinois, at the age of 97.

References

External links 
H.E. Nutt Archives
Composers/Arrangers

1898 births
1996 deaths
American music arrangers
20th-century American composers